J. R. Jones (1925 – 2014) was an historian of seventeenth century England.

He was lecturer in history at King's College, Newcastle from 1952 to 1963 and at the University of East Anglia from 1963 to 1966. He was appointed Professor of History at East Anglia in 1966.

Works

The First Whigs: The Politics of the Exclusion Crisis, 1678-1683 (Cambridge University Press, 1961).
Britain and Europe in the Seventeenth Century (1966).
The Revolution of 1688 in England (Weidenfeld and Nicolson, 1972).
Country and Court: England, 1658-1714 (Edward Arnold, 1978).
The Restored Monarchy, 1660-1688 (Palgrave Macmillan, 1979).
Charles II: Royal Politician (Allen and Unwin, 1987).
Marlborough (Cambridge University Press, 1993).

Notes

1920s births
Living people
Academics of the University of East Anglia
English historians
Historians of England